Helminthosporiosis may refer to two diseases of wheat:

 Cochliobolus sativus, which causes spot blotch
 Pyrenophora tritici-repentis, which causes tan spot